Nuestra Señora del Carmen (Our Lady of Mount Carmel in English) is a parish church in la Atunara, La Línea de la Concepción, Andalusia, Spain. The feast day is on 16 July known locally as the 'Festividad de la Virgen del Carmen'.

References

Churches in the Province of Cádiz
La Línea de la Concepción
19th-century Roman Catholic church buildings in Spain